Tommy Alverson is a Texas Country musician from Mineral Wells, Texas. He attended and played varsity football at Itasca High School with Austin's Sam Baker (then known as Dick Baker). During junior college, he played guitar with James Hand, and later produced Hand's first album.

Alverson has shared the stage with Texas musicians Willie Nelson, Johnny Bush, Johnny Gimble, Jerry Jeff Walker, Clay Blaker, Gary P. Nunn, Ray Wylie Hubbard, Radney Foster, and Steven Fromholz, as well as Robert Earl Keen, Pat Green, Charlie Robison, Dale Watson, and singer/songwriter Jim Lauderdale.

Website
https://www.tommyalverson.com/

History
Alverson continues to expand his loyal fan base throughout Texas, especially in Lubbock, as well as overseas with his songwriting and performances.

Alverson's regular bandmates are son Justin on lead guitar, Ray Austin on steel and Dobro, Ron Thompson on drums, Jerry Abrams on bass, and Thurston Selby and Heather Woodruff on fiddle. His new band consists of Ray Austin, Eric Holmes on drums, Justin Lightfoot on bass and vocals, Thurston Selby on fiddle and vocals, and Justin Alverson on guitar and vocals. Alverson and the band were picked along with 19 other acts, for the Miller Lite True to Texas campaign in 2000. Alverson has been featured in radio and TV commercials for Dairy Queen, Miller Lite, and Texana Grill. Alverson was also voted The Terry Award's Entertainer Of The Year in 2000.

His discography includes Texasongs, a compilation of his first two cassette releases,
"From The Heart Of Hill County" and "Always In My Heart", Live at Ozona, produced by legendary producer Phil York, Me On The Jukebox, co-produced by Alverson and Lloyd Maines (which contains the hit "Una Mas Cerveza"), and Alive And Pickin, which was recorded live at the historic Chatauqua Auditorium in Waxahachie, Texas. Also, Alverson's "Hill Country Here I Come" is featured on the 2001 release Texas Road Trip compilation by Compadre Records. Smith Music Group, who distributes CDs by Cooder Graw, Jason Boland, Cory Morrow and many others, has acquired the distribution rights to all Alverson's CDs.

Alverson released Heroes and Friends in June 2004. Several guest artists included on the CD, were Gary P. Nunn, Rusty Wier, Mike Graham, Davin James, Mike Crow and Heather Morgan. Alverson's fifth studio release, titled Country to the Bone, was his debut on Palo Duro Records. The album won the 2007 Best Country and Western Music Award from Fort Worth Weekly, and was released at Alverson's 10th annual Texas Music Family Gathering.

Country to the Bone
Country to the Bone started out as a redo of some older Alverson compositions, before it morphed into more of an homage to some of his favorite songwriters, from Jim Lauderdale and Doug Sahm to Mickey Newbury, Clay Blaker and the team of Roy Robinson (aka Amos Staggs) and Jerri Lynn Robinson. One special guest was Pauline Reese, who sang with Alverson on "Tequila Rose", a Robinson/Robinson composition that Alverson turned into a duet. In the July 2007 Cowboys & Indians magazine, Palo Duro label founder Chris Thomas listed "Texas Woman" as one of his favorite tracks, calling it, "one of the finest love songs ever written." It also includes "Got Here as Fast as I Could," a song that might serve as the answer to Lyle Lovett's "That’s Right (You’re Not From Texas)." He offers props to another hero in "Just Like Hank," a song borrowed from pal Walt Wilkins and co-writer Davis Raines. Alverson and Wilkins co-produced the 2006 Palo Duro release, Luckenbach! Compadres! (The Songs of Luckenbach, Texas), a multi-artist celebration recorded live at Luckenbach, Texas.

Other appearances
Alverson's Texas Music Family Gathering is a steadily growing three-day festival. It began as a very small get-together in 1998 at Melody Mountain Ranch in Stephenville, Texas, where it was voted Best Outdoor Event for 1999 by the Met magazine in Dallas. It was moved from Stephenville to Smooth Water Ranch in Hico, Texas in 2000. In 2002, the festival was moved to Glen Rose at the Tres Rios River Ranch, where the numbers of fans and friends reached approximately 2,500. In 2003, the numbers rose to 4,000. Radney Foster, Johnny Bush, Rusty Wier, Ray Wylie Hubbard, Steven Fromholz, Cooder Graw, and Deryl Dodd are some of the names to have graced the stage. After 20 years, the Texas Music Family Gathering ceased to exist. Alverson has also gone to France, to perform at Country Rendez-Vous, one of Europe's biggest country music festivals.

Discography
 Texasongs (1995)
 Me on the Jukebox (1999)
 Alive and Pickin''' (2001)
 Live at Ozona Revisited (2003)
 Heroes and Friends (2004)
 Country to the Bone (2007)
 Texas One More Time (2010)
 Pickin' on Willie (2012)
 Live Again'' (2009)

References

External links
 Official site
 

Living people
American country singer-songwriters
People from Fort Worth, Texas
Singer-songwriters from Texas
Country musicians from Texas
Year of birth missing (living people)
American male singer-songwriters